Panakkachira is a small village in Kanjirappally taluk of Kottayam District, Kerala, India.

References

Villages in Kottayam district